The Schneider Grunau 7 Moazagotl was a high-performance sailplane designed in Germany in 1933 specifically for fast, long distance flying using strong thermals.

Design and development
Wolf Hirth was one of the first pilots to understand the glider characteristics necessary for cross-country flying on days with separated, strong thermals. He commissioned Edmund Schneider to build a one-off example, to be designed by Friedrich Wenk.

The result was the Moazagotl. Moazagotl was the nickname of Motz Gottlieb, formed from a corruption of his name, who was a farmer in the Silesian countryside near the Schneider works. He had noticed that with the wind in a particular direction, cloud formed over a nearby valley remained stationary even though the wind was strong. The phenomenon was communicated to meteorologists at an observatory near Breslau and their director passed on the observations to the glider pilots at Grunau, who thus became the first to exploit wave lift.

The Moazagottl was a high gull wing glider.  The inner third of the span carried a dihedral of about 8° and was rectangular in plan.  Single, broad-chord faired lift struts on each side braced these sections from about 20% of the span to the lower fuselage.  Outboard the wing had no dihedral and was strongly swept on the leading edge, resulting in marked taper. Long ailerons occupied the whole trailing edge of each outer panels; these were slightly tapered and projected behind the trailing edge of the inner sections. The wing was built around a single, swept main spar which was straight in plan, simplifying its change in direction between the inner and outer panels.  Diagonal sub-spars ran inwards and rearwards from it between the lift strut attachment points and the fuselage.  Plywood skinning forward of these spars around the leading edge formed a D-box; aft, the wing, including the aileron, was fabric covered.

Its fuselage was ply covered and roughly oval in cross section, with a somewhat pointed nose and tapering gently and uniformly from wing to tail.  The cockpit, just ahead of the leading edge, was enclosed by a plywood cover in Musterle fashion, providing illumination and limited views through small windows and portholes. Instrumentation was generous, including a variometer though lacking an artificial horizon for cloud flying.   of water ballast was contained in a tank behind the pilot's seat.  At the rear a tapered all moving tailplane was mounted just above the fuselage and far enough forward to need only a small cut out for rudder movement.  All tail surfaces were largely fabric covered, with ply leading edges.  There was no fin but the balanced rudder was much increased in chord and area after early flight tests demonstrated the power of the ailerons.  The Moazagotl landed on a slender skid that reached from nose to mid chord, assisted by a faired tail skid.

Operational history

The following year he flew it , only the second plot to achieve this distance. In the 1937 competition, retrospectively recognised as the first of the World Gliding Championships, Ludwig Hofmann flew the four years old Moazagotl into second place. It also made a visit to Brazil. The sole example was preserved in the Hornberg Museum until the end of World War II, when it was deliberately burned to prevent it falling into allied hands.

Specifications

References

Further reading

 

1930s German sailplanes
Glider aircraft
Aircraft first flown in 1933
Edmund Schneider aircraft